Bill Sautter is a retired American soccer player who played professionally in the North American Soccer League, Major Indoor Soccer League, American Soccer League and United Soccer League.

Family
Bill Sautter Sr. has three children. His oldest son is named H. Sautter Jr. His only daughter is named Katherine Emma Sautter,. His youngest son is named Jimmy Sautter.

Soccer

Youth
In 1974, Sautter graduated from Abington High School where he was a 1973 All State soccer player.  He was inducted into the Abington High School Hall of Fame in 1992.  He then attended Temple University where he played on the men's soccer team from 1974 to 1977. He was a 1975 Honorable Mention (third team) and a 1976 and 1977 Second Team All American.

Professional
In 1978, he turned professional with the Tulsa Roughnecks of the North American Soccer League. He set a league record by scoring three goals in his first four shots on goal. In the fall of 1979, he moved to the Los Angeles Aztecs for the 1979–1980 NASL indoor season. In the spring of 1980, he moved to the San Jose Earthquakes, but was released early in the 1981 season. He then signed with the Pennsylvania Stoners of the American Soccer League.  In 1982, he joined the Oklahoma City Slickers of the American Soccer League.  In July 1983, the league indefinitely suspended him after he assaulted a referee who had just ejected him from a game against the Pennsylvania Stoners. In 1984, he played for the Oklahoma City Stampede in the United Soccer League.  In 1985, he played for the Tulsa Tornados.

Golf
Sautter began playing golf when he was 30. He now is the golf instructor at the Philadelphia Cricket Club and has played in a few Champions Tour events.

References

External links
 NASL stats

1958 births
Living people
American male golfers
American soccer players
American Soccer League (1933–1983) players
San Jose Earthquakes (1974–1988) players
Golfers from Pennsylvania
Los Angeles Aztecs players
Major Indoor Soccer League (1978–1992) players
North American Soccer League (1968–1984) indoor players
North American Soccer League (1968–1984) players
Oklahoma City Slickers (ASL) players
Oklahoma City Stampede players
Soccer players from Pennsylvania
Temple Owls men's soccer players
Tulsa Roughnecks (1978–1984) players
Tulsa Tornados players
United Soccer League (1984–85) players
Association football defenders